Francesco Monaco (died December 1626) was a Roman Catholic prelate who served as Bishop of Martirano (1591–1626).

Biography
On 1 July 1591, Francesco Monaco was appointed during the papacy of Pope Gregory XIV as Bishop of Martirano. On 4 April 1592, he was consecrated bishop by Giovanni Battista Costanzo, Archbishop of Cosenza, with Clemente Bontodasio, Bishop of Nicastro, and Orazio Schipano, Bishop of Belcastro, serving as co-consecrators. He served as Bishop of Martirano until his death in December 1626.

References

External links and additional sources
 (for Chronology of Bishops) 
 (for Chronology of Bishops)  

16th-century Italian Roman Catholic bishops
17th-century Italian Roman Catholic bishops
Bishops appointed by Pope Gregory XIV
1626 deaths